Khaled Mashud, popularly known as Khaled Mashud Pilot (born 8 February 1976) is a former Bangladeshi cricketer and a captain in Tests and ODIs.  A wicketkeeper and middle order batsman, he was a regular member of the national team between 1995 and 2007.  Bangladeshi coach Dav Whatmore claimed Mashud as the "best wicketkeeper in Asia." He contributed to Bangladesh's first ever ODI hat-trick by taking two catches off Shahadat Hossain's bowling. After the international retirement in 2008, he continued to play domestic cricket in Bangladesh as captain of the Rajshahi Division team. Mashud announced his retirement from domestic cricket after captaining his team to win the title in 2011.

Personal life
His father Shamsu was a prominent Bangladeshi footballer in the 1970s. A striker, he formed a partnership with Kazi Salahuddin and helped Abahani Krira Chakra win the Dhaka League title in 1977.

Khaled Mashud has been selected as the new Bangladesh team manager for the upcoming away series against New Zealand.

Early days
Mashud played for the Bangladesh U-19 side in 1993. Apart from his keeping duties. he also took the important responsibility of batting at No. 3. Within couple of years, he graduated to the national team and played against the touring England 'A' team in February 1995. His ODI debut came later in the year at Sharjah.

International career

In Test cricket
He made an impressive Test debut with the bat, scoring 32 and 21* in the historic match against India in November 2000. But his most memorable moment in Test cricket came in the West Indies in May 2004. Despite taking a first innings lead of 64, Bangladesh ran into trouble, losing their first seven wickets for just 123 runs. Mashud then led a late order recovery to take the score to 271/9 (decl.). The declaration came just after Mashud completed his hundred (103*). He was given excellent support by Rafiq (29) and Tapash (26).
Behind the stumps, his 87 dismissals from 44 matches does not sound very impressive, but he was playing for a side which possessed very little venom in their bowling department.

One Day Internationals
Mashud was a vital member of the triumphant Bangladesh team in the 1997 ICC trophy. There, he topped the batting averages for his country, scoring 92 runs and getting out only once. He was MoM in the SF against Scotland after scoring 70 and sharing a 115 run partnership with Aminul Islam. In the final, he scored a quickfire 15* from just 7 deliveries to take Bangladesh home to a last ball victory. His innings included two massive hits for six. He also enjoyed a highly successful time behind the stumps with 12 catches and 11 stumpings.

Mashud had little chance to show his mettle as a one-day batsman, as he almost inevitably came to bat with his team struggling. Still, he managed to get a top score of 71*, against the Australians in 2005. With the Bangladesh spinners being more effective in limited-over games, Mashud had more chance to show his class. His 91 catches and 35 stumpings in ODI testify to that.

Mashud had a brief stint as captain of Bangladesh. But, he lost his captaincy in acrimonious circumstances following the 2003 World Cup in Africa. Bangladesh suffered defeats at the hands of Canada and Kenya amidst allegations of match fixing. Although the allegations were not proved Mashud was stripped of his captaincy duty. In February 2006, he was fined after being found guilty of bringing the game into disrepute during a match against Sri Lanka.

His place in the side came under threat, however, with the emergence of Mushfiqur Rahim, combined with his own failure to score a half century in 24 Test innings. He was subsequently dropped from the Bangladesh squad for the 2007 Cricket World Cup and after a brief return against Sri Lanka did not feature, with Rahim and Dhiman Ghosh being preferred as wicketkeepers. He announced his retirement from international cricket in 2008.

References

External links
Cricinfo profile on: Khaled Mashud

1976 births
Living people
Bangladesh One Day International cricketers
Bangladesh Test cricketers
Bangladesh Test cricket captains
Bangladeshi cricketers
20th-century Bangladeshi cricketers
21st-century Bangladeshi cricketers
Rajshahi Division cricketers
Cricketers at the 1998 Commonwealth Games
Cricketers at the 1999 Cricket World Cup
Cricketers at the 2003 Cricket World Cup
Kala Bagan Cricket Academy cricketers
Abahani Limited cricketers
Victoria Sporting Club cricketers
Dhaka Metropolis cricketers
Bangladeshi cricket coaches
Bangladesh Premier League coaches
Recipients of the Bangladesh National Sports Award
Commonwealth Games competitors for Bangladesh
Wicket-keepers
People from Rajshahi District